A sustainable food system is a type of food system that provides healthy food to people and creates sustainable environmental, economic and social systems that surround food. Sustainable food systems start with the development of sustainable agricultural practices, development of more sustainable food distribution systems, creation of sustainable diets and reduction of food waste throughout the system. Sustainable food systems have been argued to be central to many or all 17 Sustainable Development Goals.

Moving to sustainable food systems, including via shifting consumption to sustainable diets, is an important component of addressing the causes of climate change and adapting to it. A 2020 review conducted for the European Union found that up to 37% of global greenhouse gas emissions could be attributed to the food system, including crop and livestock production, transportation, changing land use (including deforestation) and food loss and waste. Reduction of meat production, which e.g. accounts for ~60% of GHG emissions and ~75% of agriculturally used land, is one major component of this change.

The global food system is facing major interconnected challenges, including mitigating food insecurity, effects from climate change, biodiversity loss, malnutrition, inequity, soil degradation, pest outbreaks, water and energy scarcity, economic and political crises, natural resource depletion and preventable ill-health.

The concept of sustainable food systems is frequently at the center of sustainability-focused policy programs, such as proposed Green New Deal programs.

Definition 
There are many different definitions of a sustainable food system.

From a global perspective, the Food and Agriculture Organization of the United Nations describes a sustainable food system as follows:

The American Public Health Association (APHA) defines a sustainable food system as:

The European Union's Scientific Advice Mechanism defines a sustainable food system as a system that:

Problems with conventional food systems 

Industrial agriculture causes environmental impacts, as well as health problems associated with obesity in the rich world and hunger in the poor world. This has generated a strong movement towards healthy, sustainable eating as a major component of overall ethical consumerism.

Conventional food systems are largely based on the availability of inexpensive fossil fuels, which is necessary for mechanized agriculture, the manufacture or collection of chemical fertilizers, the processing of food products, and the packaging of foods. Food processing began when the number of consumers started growing rapidly. The demand for cheap and efficient calories climbed, which resulted in nutrition decline. Industrialized agriculture, due to its reliance on economies of scale to reduce production costs, often leads to the compromising of local, regional, or even global ecosystems through fertilizer runoff, nonpoint source pollution, deforestation, suboptimal mechanisms affecting consumer product choice, and greenhouse gas emissions.

Options 
Based on the location a person may live at it will determine the amount and type of food resources accessible to them. Therefore, not everyone receives the same quality of food. In addition, conventional channels do not distribute food by emergency assistance or charity.  Urban residents receive a more sustainable food production from healthier and safer sources than low-income communities. Nonetheless, conventional channels are more sustainable than charitable or welfare food resources. Even though the conventional food system provides easier access and lower prices, their food may not be the best for our environment nor health.

Complications from globalization
Also, the need to reduce production costs in an increasingly global market can cause production of foods to be moved to areas where economic costs (labor, taxes, etc.) are lower or environmental regulations are more lax, which are usually further from consumer markets. For example, the majority of salmon sold in the United States is raised off the coast of Chile, due in large part to less stringent Chilean standards regarding fish feed and regardless of the fact that salmon are not indigenous in Chilean coastal waters. The globalization of food production can result in the loss of traditional food systems in less developed countries, and have negative impacts on the population health, ecosystems, and cultures in those countries.

Systemic structures
Furthermore, the conventional food system does not structurally facilitate sustainable patterns of food production and consumption. In decision-making associated with the conventional food system, responsibility is in practice largely thought to rest with consumers and private companies in that they are often anticipated to spend time to – voluntarily and/or without external benefit – seek to educate themselves on which behaviours and specific product-choices are sustainable, in cases where such product-information and education is publicly available, and to subsequently change their respective decision-making related to production and consumption due to prioritized assumed ethical values and sometimes health-benefits, despite substantial drawbacks to such being common. For consumers such drawbacks may include higher prices of organic foods, inappropriate relative monetary price gaps between animal-intensive diets and plant-based ones and inadequate consumer guidance by contemporary valuations. In 2020, an analysis of external climate costs of foods indicated that external greenhouse gas costs are typically highest for animal-based products – conventional and organic to about the same extent within that ecosystem subdomain – followed by conventional dairy products and lowest for organic plant-based foods and concludes contemporary monetary evaluations to be "inadequate" and policy-making that lead to reductions of these costs to be possible, appropriate and urgent.

Agricultural pollution

Sourcing sustainable food 

At the global level the environmental impact of agribusiness is being addressed through sustainable agriculture, cellular agriculture and organic farming.

Various alternatives to meat and novel or classes of foods can substantially increase sustainability. There are large potentials and benefits of marine algae-based aquaculture for the development of a future healthy and sustainable food system. Fungiculture, another sector of a growing bioeconomy besides algaculture, may also become a larger component of a sustainable food system. Consumption shares of various other ingredients for meat analogues such as protein from pulses may also rise substantially in a sustainable food system.   Optimised dietary scenarios would also see changes in various other types of foods such as nuts and pulses such as beans, which have favorable environmental and health profiles. 

Complementary approaches under development include vertical farming of various types of foods and various agricultural technologies, often using digital agriculture.

Sustainable seafood 

Sustainable seafood is seafood from either fished or farmed sources that can maintain or increase production in the future without jeopardizing the ecosystems from which it was acquired. The sustainable seafood movement has gained momentum as more people become aware about both overfishing and environmentally destructive fishing methods.

Sustainable animal feed 

A study suggests there would be large environmental benefits of using insects for animal feed.

Sustainable pet food 
The first review on the topic indicated vegan diets, which are more sustainable, would not have adverse impacts on the health of pet dogs and cats if implemented appropriately.

Substitution of meat and sustainable meat and dairy

Meat reduction strategies

Effects and combination of measures 

"Policy sequencing" to gradually extend regulations once established to other forest risk commodities (e.g. other than beef) and regions and coordinating with other importing countries could prevent ineffectiveness.

Meat and dairy 
Despite meat from livestock such as beef and lamb being considered unsustainable, some regenerative agriculture proponents suggest to rear livestock with mixed farming system to restore organic matter in grasslands. Organizations such as the Canadian Roundtable for Sustainable Beef (CRSB) are looking for solutions to reduce the impact of meat production on the environment. In October 2021, 17% of beef sold in Canada was certified as sustainable beef by the CRSB. However, sustainable meat has led to criticism, as environmentalists point out that the meat industry excludes most of its emissions.

Important mitigation options for reducing the greenhouse gas emissions from livestock include genetic selection, introduction of methanotrophic bacteria into the rumen, vaccines, feeds, toilet-training, diet modification and grazing management. Other options include shifting to ruminant-free alternatives, such as to milk substitutes and meat analogues or e.g. poultry, which generates far fewer emissions.

Plant-based meat is proposed for sustainable alternatives to meat consumption. Plant-based meat emits 30%–90% less greenhouse gas than conventional meat (kg--eq/kg-meat)  and 72%–99% less water than conventional meat. Public company Beyond Meat and privately held company Impossible Foods are examples of plant-based food production. However, consulting firm Sustainalytics assured that these companies are not more sustainable than meat-processors competitors such as food processor JBS, and they don't disclose all the  emissions of their supply chain.

Beyond reducing negative impacts of meat production, facilitating shifts towards more sustainable meat, and facilitating reduced meat consumption (including via plant-based meat substitutes), cultured meat may offer a potentially sustainable way to produce real meat without the associated negative environmental impacts.

Phase-outs, co-optimization and environmental standards 

In regards to deforestation, a study proposed kinds of "climate clubs" of "as many other states as possible taking similar measures and establishing uniform environmental standards". It suggested that "Otherwise, global problems remain unsolvable, and shifting effects will occur" and that "border adjustments [...] have to be introduced to target those states that do not participate—again, to avoid shifting effects with ecologically and economically detrimental consequences", with such "border adjustments or eco-tariffs" incentivizing other countries to adjust their standards and domestic production to join the climate club. Identified potential barriers to sustainability initiatives may include contemporary trade-policy goals and competition law. Greenhouse gas emissions for countries are often measured according to production, for imported goods that are produced in other countries than where they are consumed "embedded emissions" refers to the emissions of the product. In cases where such products are and remain getting imported, eco-tariffs could over time adjust prices for specific categories of products – or for specific noncollaborative polluting origin countries – such as deforestation-associated meat, foods with intransparent supply-chain origin or foods with high embedded emissions.

Agricultural productivity and environmental efficiency 
Agricultural productivity (including e.g. reliability of yields) is an important component of food security and increasing it sustainably (e.g. with high efficiency in terms of environmental impacts) can be a major way to decrease negative environmental impacts such as by decreasing the amount of land needed for farming or reducing environmental degradation like deforestation.

Genetically engineered crops 
There is research and development to engineer genetically modified crops with e.g. increased heat/drought/stress resistance, increased yields, lower water requirements, and overall lower environmental impacts.

Novel agricultural technologies

Organic food

Local food systems 

Local and regional food systems, commonly confused with direct marketing but both are distinct terms, come in multiple types and definitions. Local food demands from consumers within these systems include organic practices, greater nutritional value, better quality, and fresher product. Sometimes sold at lower prices, local food supply from farmers can also come at higher costs due to the environmentally sustainable production practices and through direct marketing farmers can even receive benefits for business such as consumer desires through fast product feedback. Local and regional food systems also face challenges such as inadequate institutions or programs, geographic limitations, and seasonal fluctuations which can affect product demand within regions. In addition, direct marketing also faces challenges of accessibility, coordination, and awareness. Farmers markets, which have increased over the past two decades, are designed for supporting local farmers in selling their fresh products to consumers who are wishing to buy. Food hubs are also similar locations where farmers deliver products and consumers come to pick them up. Consumers who wish to have weekly produce delivered can buy shares through a system called Community-Supported Agriculture (CSA). However, these farmer markets also face challenges with marketing needs such as starting up, advertisement, payments, processing, and regulations.

There are various movements working towards local food production, more productive use of urban wastelands and domestic gardens including permaculture, guerilla gardening, urban horticulture, local food, slow food, sustainable gardening, and organic gardening.

Debates over local food system efficiency and sustainability have risen as these systems decrease transportation which is a strategy for combating environmental footprints and climate change. A popular argument is the less impactful footprint of food products from local markets on communities and environment. Main factors behind climate change include land use practices and greenhouse emissions as global food systems produce approximately 33% of theses emissions. Compared to transportation in a local food system, a conventional system takes more fuel for energy and emits more pollution such as carbon dioxide. This transportation also includes miles for agricultural products to help with agriculture and depends on factors such as transportation sizes, modes, and fuel types. Some airplane importations have shown to be more efficient than local food systems in some cases. Overall, local food systems can often support better environmental practices.

Environmental impact of food miles 
Studies found that food miles are a relatively minor factor of carbon emissions, albeit increased food localization may also enable additional, more significant, environmental benefits such as recycling of energy, water, and nutrients. For specific foods regional differences in harvest seasons may make it more environmentally friendly to import from distant regions than more local production and storage or local production in greenhouses. This may vary depending on the environmental standards in the respective country, the distance of the respective countries and on a case-by-case basis for different foods.

However, a 2022 study suggests global food miles  emissions are 3.5–7.5 times higher than previously estimated, with transport accounting for about 19% of total food-system emissions, albeit shifting towards plant-based diets remains substantially more important. Because of such a shift being needed and because the transport of vegetables, fruits, cereal and flour make up the largest share of the emissions, the study concludes that "a shift towards plant-based foods must be coupled with more locally produced items, mainly in affluent countries".

Food distribution 

In food distribution, increasing food supply is a production problem as it takes time for products to get marketed and as they wait to get distributed the food goes to waste. Despite the fact that throughout all food production an estimated 20-30% of food is wasted, there have been efforts to combat this issue such as campaigns conducted to promote limiting food waste. However, due to insufficient facilities and practices as well as huge amounts of food unmarketed or harvested due to prices or quality, food is wasted through each phase of its distribution. Another factor for lack of sustainability within food distribution includes transportation in combination with inadequate methods for food handling throughout the packing process. Additionally, poor or long conditions for food in storage and consumer waste add to this list of factors for inefficiency found in food distribution.

Some modern tendencies in food distribution also create bounds in which problems are created and solutions must be met. One factor includes growth of large-scale producing and selling units in bulk to chain stores which displays merchandising power from large scale market organizations as well as their mergence with manufactures. In response to production, another factor includes large scale distributing and buying units among manufacturers in development of food distribution which also affects producers, distributors, and consumers. Another main factor involves protecting public interest which means better adaptation for product and service which results in rapid development of food distribution. A further factor revolves around price maintenance which creates pressure for lower prices resulting in higher drive for lower cost throughout the whole food distribution process. An additional factor comprises new changes and forms of newly invented technical processes such as developments of freezing food discovered through experiments to help with distribution efficiency. In addition to this, new technical development in distributing machinery to meet the influence of consumer demands and economic factors. Lastly, another factor includes government relation to business those who petition against it in correlation with anti-trust laws due to large scale business organizations and the fear of monopoly contributing to changing public attitude.

Food security, nutrition and diet 

The environmental effects of different dietary patterns depend on many factors, including the proportion of animal and plant foods consumed and the method of food production. At the same time, current and future food systems need to be provided with sufficient nutrition for not only the current population, but future population growth in light of a world affected by changing climate in the face of global warming.

Nearly one in four households in the United States have experienced food insecurity in 2020–21.  Even before the pandemic hit, some 13.7 million households, or 10.5% of all U.S. households, experienced food insecurity at some point during 2019, according to data from the U.S. Department of Agriculture. That works out to more than 35 million Americans who were either unable to acquire enough food to meet their needs, or uncertain of where their next meal might come from, last year.

The "global land squeeze" for agricultural land also has impacts on food security. Likewise, effects of climate change on agriculture can result in lower crop yields and nutritional quality due to for example drought, heat waves and flooding as well as increases in water scarcity, pests and plant diseases. Soil conservation may be important for food security as well. For sustainability and food security, the food system would need to adapt to such current and future problems.

According to one estimate, "just four corporations control 90% of the global grain trade" and researchers have argued that the food system is too fragile due to various issues, such as "massive food producers" (i.e. market-mechanisms) having too much power and nations "polarising into super-importers and super-exporters".  However the impact of market power on the food system is contested with other claiming more complex context dependent outcomes.

Production decision-making 

In the food industry, especially in agriculture there has been a rise of problems towards the production of some food products. For instance, growing vegetables and fruits has become more expensive. It is difficult to grow some agricultural crops because some have a preferable climate condition for developing. There has also been an incline on food shortages as production has decreased. However, the world still produces enough food for the population but not everyone receives good quality food because it's not accessible to them since it depends on their location and/or income. In addition, the amount of overweight people has increased and there are about 2 billion people that are underfed worldwide. This shows how the global food system lacks quantity and quality according to the food consumption patterns.

A study estimated that "relocating current croplands to [environmentally] optimal locations, whilst allowing ecosystems in then-abandoned areas to regenerate, could simultaneously decrease the current carbon, biodiversity, and irrigation water footprint of global crop production by 71%, 87%, and 100%", with relocation only within national borders also having substantial potential.

Policies, including policies that affect consumption may affect production-decisions, such as which foods are produced, to various degrees and in various indirect and direct ways. Individual studies have named several proposed options of such and the restricted website Project Drawdown has aggregated and preliminarily evaluated some of such measures.

Nitrogen pollution mitigation

Climate change adaptation

Food waste 

According to the Food and Agriculture Organization (FAO), food waste is responsible for 8 percent of global human-made greenhouse gas emissions. The FAO concludes that nearly 30 percent of all available agricultural land in the world – 1.4 billion hectares – is used for produced but uneaten food. The global blue water footprint of food waste is 250 km3, that is the amount of water that flows annually through the Volga or 3 times Lake Geneva.

There are several factors that explain how food waste has increased globally in food systems. The main factor is population because as population increases more food production is being made but most food produce goes to waste. In addition, not all countries have the same resources to provide the best quality of food. According to a study done in 2010, private households produce the largest amounts of food waste across the globe. Another major factor is overproduction; the rate of food production is significantly higher than the rate of consumption, leading to a surplus of food waste.

Throughout the world there are different ways that food is being processed. With different priorities different choices are being made to meet their most important needs. Money is another big factor that determines how long the process will take, who is working, and it is treated way differently than low income countries' food systems. 

However, high income countries food systems still may deal with other issues such as food security. This demonstrates how all food systems have their weaknesses and strengths. Climate change is affecting food waste to increase because the warm temperature causes crops to dry faster and have a higher risk for fires. Food waste can occur throughout any time of production. According to the World Wild Life Organization, since most food produced goes to landfills when it rots it causes methane to be produced. The disposal of the food has a big impact on our environment and health.

Academic discipline 
The study of sustainable food applies systems theory and methods of sustainable design towards food systems. As an interdisciplinary field, the study of sustainable food systems has been growing in the last several decades. University programs focused on sustainable food systems include:
 University of Colorado
 Harvard Extension
 University of Delaware
 Mesa Community College
 University of California, Davis
 University of Vermont
 Sterling College (Vermont)
 University of Michigan
 Portland State University
 University of Sheffield's Institute for Sustainable Food
 University of Georgia's Sustainable Food Systems Initiative
 The Culinary Institute of America's Master's in Sustainable Food Systems
 University of Edinburgh's Global Academy of Agriculture and Food Systems

There is a debate about "establishing a body akin to the Intergovernmental Panel on Climate Change (IPCC) for food systems" which "would respond to questions from policymakers and produce advice based on a synthesis of the available evidence" while identifying "gaps in the science that need addressing".

Public policy

European Union

Global

Asia

See also 
 Standardization#Environmental protection

References

Cited sources

Further reading 
 
 
 Monbiot, George (2022). "Regenesis: Feeding the World without Devouring the Planet". London: Penguin Books. 
 Pimbert, Michel, Rachel Shindelar, and Hanna Schösler (eds.), "Think Global, Eat Local: Exploring Foodways," RCC Perspectives 2015, no. 1. doi.org/10.5282/rcc/6920.
 
 
  AGRIS record.

 
Food politics
Sustainability